In mathematics, potential good reduction is a property of the reduction modulo a prime or, more generally, prime ideal, of an algebraic variety.

Definitions
Good reduction refers to the reduced variety having the same properties as the original, for example, an algebraic curve having the same genus, or a smooth variety remaining smooth.  Potential good reduction refers to the situation over a sufficiently large finite extension of the field of definition.

Equivalent formulations
For elliptic curves, potential good reduction is equivalent to the j-invariant being an algebraic integer.

See also
Elliptic surface

References
 

Abelian varieties